CEA-LIST, is one of three specialized technological research institutes of CEA (French Alternative Energies and Atomic Energy Commission) Technological Research Division (CEA Tech) and specializes on digital systems.

Overview 
Based in Saclay (Paris region, France), List Institute works in partnership with French and foreign industrial companies on applied research projects in four main topics:
 Advanced manufacturing
 Embedded systems
 Data intelligence
 Health ionizing radiations
CEA LIST is a part of the "Carnot Institute" and invests 25% of its budget into scientific resourcing actions every year. CEA LIST is focused to identify better technological breakthroughs for the advancement of research. In October 2019, it still has no official director (just a temporary one) since October 2018. In November 2019, a new director has been nominated.

Research programmes 
CEA LIST is involved in various research programs described in this section.

Advanced Manufacturing 
CEA LIST, works towards advanced manufacturing by supporting industry to produce in a more effective and sustainable way and involves in exploratory research in emerging technology for smart manufacturing such as, modelling and simulation, knowledge engineering, data processing, vision, information and communication systems etc.

The main activities in context of advanced manufacturing fall into the following six categories:
 Collaborative robotics
 Virtual reality
 Augmented reality
 Non destructive testing
 Instrumentation
 Radioactivity metrology

Embedded Systems 
CEA LIST, works on various development aspect of software and embedded systems and provides methods, tools and components for optimizing systems’ quality and performance.

Papyrus and Frama-C are on eof the well known open source tools being used in various industrial and academic context.

The embedded systems labs consist of a large number of research engineers who dedicate their time to enhance the five topics integrating safety, security, reliability and performance requests. The lab works on the following category of activities: 
 Design and analysis 
 Validation and verification 
 Sensors integration 
 IPs and components for reliability, safety and security
 Computing architectures

Ambient Intelligence 
CEA LIST, works on development of a global approach for ambient intelligence applications which include HMI (Human Machine Interface) aspects, from perception to user’s restitution.

The research is carried out to addresses various industrial sectors and problems, such as, security (videosurveillance, pedestrian detection…), health, energy, transport and digital economy (data filtering and analysis, search engines…).

A large number of research engineers work on four main application in this fields:
 Diamond material and sensors
 Internet of things
 Data analysis
 Knowledge engineering

Radiations Control for Health 
CEA LIST, works towards improving  the safety and efficiency of treatments, to reduce the amount of doses and to develop new therapies.

CEA LIST, work on radiations control for health is held by two entities of reference: 
 The Henry-Becquerel National Laboratory (LNHB)
 National French reference laboratory for metrology
DOSEO platform is unique in France as it consists of advanced technological equipment for imaging and radiotherapy.

The research is conducted in partnership both with the medical body and the industrial sector where many research engineers work on two big topics:
 Calibration tools and dose metrology
 Modeling and simulation

Partnerships

Scientific partnerships 
As a member of Carnot institutes network, CEA LIST, works both on technological research and on upstream resourcing research. Resourcing activities are based on historical relations with high level academic partners.

Industrial Partnerships 
Despite an international economic crisis, there has been a solid growth for CEA LIST which testifies its relevant choices concerning its research work priorities and the ability to fulfill the industrial partners’ needs. Concerning large companies, the issue at stake is about designing global industrial solutions within a restricted demanding time to market.

References

External links
 CEA-LIST Official Website 
 CEA Official Website  (English)
 CEA Official Website  (French)

French Alternative Energies and Atomic Energy Commission
Government agencies of France
Carnot Institute ARTS
Paris-Saclay University